Wolf Wilhelm Friedrich Graf von Baudissin (26 September 1847 – 6 February 1926) was a German Protestant theologian who was a native of Sophienhof, near Kiel.

Education 
Baudissin studied theology and Oriental studies at Berlin, Erlangen, Leipzig and Kiel, earning his doctorate in 1870 at Leipzig.

Academic work 
In Leipzig, Baudissin worked as privatdocent from 1874 to 1876. In 1876 he was appointed associate professor of theology at the University of Strassburg, where four years later he gained a full professorship.

In 1881 he became a professor of Old Testament exegesis at the University of Marburg, where he remained until 1900. From 1900 to 1921, he was a professor at the University of Berlin. He was rector of the university in 1912–1913.
Theologian Franz Delitzsch (1813–1890) and Orientalist Heinrich Leberecht Fleischer (1801–1888) were major influences in his career.

Field of work 
Baudissin was a prominent figure in the Religionsgeschichtliche Schule (School of Religious History). He is largely remembered for his work involving analysis of various ancient Semitic faiths in order to clarify the religious meaning of the Biblical Old Testament.

Baudissin is referenced in Harold Frederic's novel The Damnation of Theron Ware.

Selected publications

 Translationis antiquæ arabicæ libri Jobi quæ supersunt nunc primum edita (Leipzig, 1870).
 Eulogius und Alvar, ein Abschnitt spanischer Kirchengeschichte aus der Zeit der Maurenherrschaft (1872).
 Jahve et Moloch, sive de ratione inter deum Israelitarum et Molochum intercedente (1874).
 Studien zur semitischen Religionsgeschichte (two volumes, 1876–1878).
 Die Geschichte des alttestamentlichen Priesterthums untersucht (1889).
 August Dillmann (1895) – biography of August Dillmann.
 Einleitung in die Bücher des Alten Testaments (1901).
 Esmun-Asklepios (Giessen, 1906).

Notes

References
 New Schaff-Herzog Encyclopedia of Religious Knowledge, Biography
  English translation
 
 

19th-century German Protestant theologians
20th-century German Protestant theologians
Writers from Kiel
Old Testament scholars
Leipzig University alumni
University of Kiel alumni
Academic staff of the University of Strasbourg
Academic staff of the University of Marburg
Academic staff of the Humboldt University of Berlin
Humboldt University of Berlin alumni
Presidents of the Humboldt University of Berlin
1847 births
1926 deaths
Burials at the Invalids' Cemetery
19th-century German male writers
19th-century German writers
German male non-fiction writers
Wolf Wilhelm Fridrich